John Hamilton (11 July 1834 – 17 August 1924) was an Australian politician.

Hamilton was born in Hobart in 1834, to William Hamilton and Mary Anne Wilson, who had arrived in Van Diemen's Land from Ireland in 1832. He studied at The Hutchins School before being apprenticed to a merchant. He later established his own business, John Hamilton & Co. In 1887 he was elected to the Tasmanian House of Assembly, representing the seat of Glenorchy. He served until his defeat in 1903. He died in 1924 in Hobart.

References

1834 births
1924 deaths
Members of the Tasmanian House of Assembly